Fairway is a city in Johnson County, Kansas, United States, and is included in the Kansas City Metropolitan Area census designation and the Shawnee Mission postal services designation.  As of the 2020 census, the population of the city was 4,170.

History
In the 1820s, the federal government reserved this area for use by the Shawnee people, who had ceded their lands east of the Mississippi River to the United States. In 1839 Methodists established the Shawnee Methodist Mission here to operate a school for the Shawnee and try to convert them to Christianity. Later it was named the Shawnee Indian Manual Labor School and also accepted Native American boarding students. 

Today the 12-acre (4.86-hectare) site has three remaining buildings; together these are known as the Shawnee Indian Mission. Most students who died at the school are believed to have been buried in unmarked graves on the grounds. Native American tribes and First Nations in Canada have been increasingly concerned in the 21st century with identifying and claiming remains of their children buried at such boarding schools, which forced separation from their families.   

During Territorial Kansas, this community was briefly the pro-slavery capital, one of the competing capitals of Kansas. After the American Civil War, European-American settlers were moving west in greater number and began to encroach on this territory. The federal government relocated the Shawnee again, forcing them to an area of Indian Territory (it is now within the present-day state of Oklahoma). 

The Shawnee Mission at Fairway is owned by the Kansas Historical Society. It has been designated as a National Historic Landmark and is operated by the city of Fairway as a museum. While state officials said in October 2022 that they planned to conduct a ground study to search for unmarked graves of Native Americans at this site, the tribe objected that they had not been fully consulted. They conducted an independent architectural survey to assess the costs of repairing the buildings. They have requested that the Kansas Historical Society and city transfer the property to them so they may undertake repairs and restoration, but so far have been refused.m 

In the 1930s, as Kansas City suburbs were developing, a developer laid out a subdivision near a golf course. It was named Fairway from its proximity to several driving ranges. Fairway was incorporated in 1949 and is known as "The City of Trees".

Fairway formed its own police force in 1949 with the appointment of a town marshal. This position was succeeded by police chiefs.

Geography

Demographics

2010 census
As of the census of 2010, there were 3,882 people, 1,749 households, and 1,062 families residing in the city. The racial makeup of the city was 95.3% White, 0.8% African American, 0.3% Native American, 1.4% Asian, 0.7% from other races, and 1.4% from two or more races. Hispanic or Latino of any race were 3.0% of the population.

There were 1,749 households, of which 27.0% had children under the age of 18 living with them, 52.0% were married couples living together, 6.8% had a female householder with no husband present, 1.9% had a male householder with no wife present, and 39.3% were non-families. 31.6% of all households were made up of individuals, and 9.8% had someone living alone who was 65 years of age or older. The average household size was 2.22 and the average family size was 2.83.

The median age in the city was 41.4 years. 21.8% of residents were under the age of 18; 4.5% were between the ages of 18 and 24; 28.4% were from 25 to 44; 30.6% were from 45 to 64; and 14.8% were 65 years of age or older. The gender makeup of the city was 47.0% male and 53.0% female.

2000 census
As of the census of 2000, there were 3,952 people, 1,781 households, and 1,102 families residing in the city. The racial makeup of the city was 96.18% White, 0.40% African American, 0.35% Native American, 1.24% Asian, 0.76% from other races, and 1.06% from two or more races. Hispanic or Latino of any race were 2.23% of the population. 22.4% were of German, 18.3% English and 16.3% Irish ancestry according to Census 2000.

There were 1,781 households, out of which 26.9% had children under the age of 18 living with them, 53.8% were married couples living together, 6.9% had a female householder with no husband present, and 38.1% were non-families. 31.4% of all households were made up of individuals, and 10.6% had someone living alone who was 65 years of age or older. The average household size was 2.21 and the average family size was 2.81.

In the city, the population was spread out, with 21.9% under the age of 18, 3.9% from 18 to 24, 32.7% from 25 to 44, 26.1% from 45 to 64, and 15.5% who were 65 years of age or older. The median age was 40 years. For every 100 females, there were 86.9 males. For every 100 females age 18 and over, there were 84.2 males.

The median income for a household in the city was $68,125, and the median income for a family was $97,163. Males had a median income of $72,350 versus $37,538 for females. The per capita income for the city was $45,456. About 0.5% of families and 1.3% of the population were below the poverty line, including none of those under age 18 and 6.3% of those age 65 or over.

Education
The Johnson County Library services Fairway, KS. The library has 13 locations in Johnson County.

Notable people
Notable individuals who were born in and/or have lived in Fairway include:
 Frank L. Hagaman (1894-1966), 31st Governor of Kansas
 Melissa Rooker (1964- ), Kansas state legislator
Greg Orman, Kansas Gubernatorial Candidate

References

Further reading

 Thomas Johnson's Story and the History of Fairway, Kansas; Joe Vaughan; Two Trails Publishing; 160 pages; 2014; .
 City of Fairway History; Commissioned by City of Fairway; 100 pages; 1976 (republished by ReAnimus Press in 2020); .

External links

 City of Fairway
 Fairway - Directory of Public Officials
 Fairway city map, KDOT

Cities in Johnson County, Kansas
Kansas City metropolitan area
Populated places established in 1949
1949 establishments in Kansas
Cities in Kansas
Capitals of Kansas